The 1997–98 Cymru Alliance was the eighth season of the Cymru Alliance after its establishment in 1990. The league was won by Rhydymwyn.

League table

External links
Cymru Alliance

Cymru Alliance seasons
2
Wales